NA-152 Multan-V is a constituency for the National Assembly of Pakistan.

Election 2002 

General elections were held on 10 Oct 2002. Syed Asad Murtaza Gillani of PPP won by 38,027 votes.

Election 2008 

General elections were held on 18 Feb 2008. Liaquat Ali Khan of PPP won by 47,880 votes.

Election 2013 

General elections were held on 11 May 2013. Syed Javed Ali Shah of PML-N won by 81,015 votes and became the  member of National Assembly.

Election 2018

By-election 2023 
A by-election will be held on 19 March 2023 due to the resignation of Ibrahim Khan, the previous MNA from this seat.

See also
NA-151 Multan-IV
NA-153 Multan-VI

References

External links 
Election result's official website

NA-152